Charles Alexandre Bertier (1 October 1860 – 26 July 1924) was a French landscape painter.

Biography 

His family owned a glove making business. He entered the "Petit Séminaire du Rondeau", where he studied design with Laurent Guétal, who introduced him to painting mountains and other impressive scenery in a style that would mark what later became known as the "École Dauphinoise", a group that also included Ernest Victor Hareux and Jean Achard.

In 1875, he enrolled at a vocational school (now known as the École Vaucanson) to learn his family's trade, as well as drawing. This was followed by military service, during which he showed off his works for the first time. Later, he was admitted to the École des Beaux-Arts in Paris, where he held several exhibitions at the Salon. In 1900, he was one of the artists who provided decorations for Le Train Bleu, a famous restaurant near the Gare de Lyon in Paris.

He was the holder of 31 awards, French and foreign, a member of the "Société des Artistes Français", a founding member of the "Société des Peintres de Montagne" and a judge on several art competition juries. He briefly departed from landscapes to produce some portraits for a benefactor in Russia who promised to place some of his works in the Hermitage.

In 1913, his studio was destroyed by a fire and he was unable to save any of the paintings, drawings and manuscripts stored there. He recovered his spirits by travelling to paint in the French and Swiss Alps, including a visit to Mont Blanc, and resumed his schedule of exhibitions.

References

Further reading 
 Association pour la création d'un musée des artistes dauphinois Corenc, Isère, Charles Bertier 1860-1924. Peintre de la montagne , exhibition catalog, 10 July to 26 September 1986, Grenoble City Hall

External links 

 ArtNet: more works by Bertier
 Charles Bertier @ the Bibliothèque Dauphinoise.

1860 births
1924 deaths
Landscape painters
Artists from Grenoble
19th-century French painters
French male painters
20th-century French painters
20th-century French male artists
19th-century French male artists